Ian Crowley (born 4 April 1948) is a former Australian rules footballer who played with Essendon in the Victorian Football League (VFL). He later played for Brunswick in the Victorian Football Association (VFA) and Berwick, before coaching Noble Park Methodists and Old Mentone Grammarians.

Notes

External links 
		

Essendon Football Club past player profile

Living people
1948 births
Australian rules footballers from Victoria (Australia)
Essendon Football Club players
Pascoe Vale Football Club players
Brunswick Football Club players